Christopher Fulford (born 1955) is a British actor who is best known for his supporting roles in many British TV shows, one of the earliest being punk Alex in the short lived sitcom Sorry, I'm A Stranger Here Myself (1981–82).

Career
Fulford was born in London. In his early career he often appeared in British crime dramas, appearing in both the ITV crime series Inspector Morse episode "Driven to Distraction" (1990) and as a killer in the early A Touch of Frost episode "Widows and Orphans" (1994). He played the role of Kaspar Van Beethoven in the movie Immortal Beloved (1994). In 1993, Fulford starred in the BBC adaptation of Scarlet and Black alongside the virtually unknown Ewan McGregor and Rachel Weisz. He appeared as a vigilante in Dalziel & Pascoe, a corrupt footballer in The Fix and Mr. Hunter in the TV series Hornblower, along with Ronald Pickup.

Fulford was featured as the murderer in the Hollywood film D-Tox (2002, with Sylvester Stallone) and starred as the sadistic schoolmaster Metcalf in the 2002 TV adaptation of Goodbye Mr Chips. He appeared in Millions (2004) and Pierrepoint (2005) and the television dramas The Last Train and Deceit. He has also appeared extensively on British television, appearing in guest roles in many episodes of series such as Inspector Morse, Cracker, Prime Suspect, Dalziel and Pascoe, Murphy's Law (fifth series), Wire in the Blood (episode "Right to Silence"), Spooks, Judge John Deed, Waking the Dead and The Brief. Fulford appeared in the ITV1 dramas Whitechapel and Collision, both alongside Phil Davis. He played a suicidal Prime Minister in the British TV-series The Last Enemy and in Crave for the 'Sarah Kane Season' in Sheffield.

Personal life
Christopher married actress Camille Coduri in 1992.  They have two children, Rosa (born 1993) and Santino (born 1996).

Partial filmography

References

External links

1955 births
English male television actors
Living people
Male actors from London
21st-century English male actors
20th-century English male actors
English male film actors